The University of Libya was a public university based in Tripoli and Benghazi, Libya. The university was established in 1955 and disestablished in 1973, when its colleges were split into two new universities: the University of Tripoli (later Al Fateh University) in Tripoli, and the University of Benghazi (later Garyounis University) in Benghazi.

History

Origins 
Despite its difficult economic situation at the time, in the 1950s the Libyan government decided to found a university. Towards that goal it sent a delegation to Egypt in 1955 to meet the then-prime minister Gamal Abdul Nasser, and seek his permission for the loan of some lecturers working in Egypt. The Egyptian government agreed, and promised to pay the salaries of the four borrowed lecturers for four years. The U.S. nominated Professor Majid Khadduri to be the dean of faculty of Literature, and took the burden of paying him.

A royal decree was issued on 15 December 1955 for the founding of the university. The first faculty to be formed was the Faculty of Literature in Benghazi, and the royal palace "Al Manar", from which King Idris I of Libya declared its independence on 24 December 1951, was assigned to be the campus.

Expansion
The next step was of course to extend the university and establish new faculties:
Faculty of Science, Tripoli, 1956.
Faculty of  Economics, Benghazi, 1957.
Faculty of Law, Benghazi, 1962.
Faculty of Agriculture, Tripoli, 1966.
Faculty of Medicine, Benghazi, 1970.

On 6 October 1968, a celebration was held for the founding of a new campus in Garyounis district of Benghazi. The celebration was attended by King Idris I, Wanis al-Qaddafi, the Prime Minister, and Abdel Moula Dughman, President of the university.

Split

In August 1973 the university split to form two new universities:
the Tripoli Campus formed the University of Tripoli; and

After 7 April 1976 the two new universities were renamed as follows:
the University of Tripoli became Al Fateh University; and 
the University of Benghazi became Garyounis University.

Presidents
A list of presidents of the University of Libya:
Mahmud El Bishti (1956–1958)
Abdel Jawad el Freitees (1958–1961)
Bakry Gaddura (1961–1963)
Mutapha Bayo (1963–1967)
Abdel Moula Dughman (1967–1969)
Omar et Tumi esh Sheibani (1969–1973)

See also
 List of split up universities

Notes

References
Mohammed Faraj Dghaim, "Al Jami'a Al Libiya fi Eidi'a Al Khamseen: Safha Mushriqa fi tarikh Libia", Al Jamei Magazine, No.10, Al-fateh 2005, Al Fateh University.
Cyrene (Quryna), a bulletin issued by U.of Libya because of founding the new campus at 6 Oct. 1968.
Garyounis University – Idarat Ash Shu'un at Tullabiya, "Nashra Ihsa'iya bi Adad al Khirijeen munthu ta'sees al Jame'a hatta amm 1982".

External links

 
Libya
History of Tripoli, Libya
History of Benghazi
Defunct universities and colleges
Educational institutions established in 1955
Educational institutions disestablished in 1973
1955 establishments in Libya